The Changattu Bhagavathy Temple is a Hindu religious shrine at Kallambalam in Kerala, India. The Goddess Kannaki (Parvathi) is the main deity in this temple.

Bharani(ഭരണി) day in the month Kumbham(കുംഭം) (February–March), is considered a special day and is celebrated in a grand manner at the temple. By getting inspired from history of Changattu Desham a book named 'Mukilan' has been written by Mr.Deepu (Native of this place)

History
Kovalan was the son of a wealthy merchant of Vaishya community in Puhar who married Kannagi. Kovalan met a dancer Madhavi and had an affair with her, which prompted him to spend all his wealth on the dancer. At last, penniless, Kovalan realised his mistake and returned to his wife Kannagi. Kovalan hoped to recoup his fortunes by trade in Madurai, by selling the precious anklet of Kannagi.

Madurai was ruled by Pandya king Nedunj Cheliyan I. When Kovalan tried to sell the anklet, it was mistaken for a stolen anklet of the queen. Kovalan was accused of having stolen the anklet and was immediately beheaded by the king without trial. When Kannagi was informed of this, she became furious, and set out to prove her husband's innocence to the king.

Kannagi came to the king's court, broke open the anklet seized from Kovalan and showed that it contained rubies, as opposed to the queen's anklets which contained pearls. Realizing the fault, the king committed suicide in shame, after having delivered such a huge miscarriage of justice. Kannagi uttered a curse that the entire city of Madurai be burnt. The capital city of Pandyas was set ablaze resulting in huge losses. However, at the request of God Shiva, she calmed down and later, attained salvation at Changattu desam.

Other festivals 

The other festivals in this temple are:

 Pongala Festival - Festival in Uthram Nakshathra on Malayalam month Medam (April–May). Thousands of women gather every year around this temple and prepare Pongala 
 ചിറപ്പ്
 ഓണാഘോഷം - Every year on Thiruvonam day Onam celebrations are taking place at Temple compound. It has unique competitions like വടംവലി,വെള്ളത്തിൽ തലയണയടി etc.. Marankottu Area have a tremendous record over Changattu area on Vadamvali competition as they have won 7 consecutive years

How to get here 

Changattu Sree Bhagavathy Temple os situated 1 km from Kaduvayil junction on NH66 Kanniyakunari-Panvel highway. The major cities near temple are Kallambalam (3 km) & Attingal (7 km). The nearest railway station is Varkala Shiva giri railway station (15 km) and the nearest Airport is Trivandrum International Airport (35 km).

The temple is easily accessible from Thiruvananthapuram and Kollam as frequent bus services are available.

Hindu temples in Thiruvananthapuram
Bhagavathi temples in Kerala